The Himalayan long-eared bat (Plecotus homochrous), also known as Hodgson's long-eared bat, is a species of bat in the family Vespertilionidae. It is ranges from the Indian subcontinent east to China and south to Vietnam.

Taxonomy 
It was previously considered a subspecies of P. auritus. It was raised to species level by Spitzenberger.

Habitat and distribution 
The species is found in India, Pakistan, and Nepal, from Murree in Pakistan through Nepal up until Darjeeling in India. It is also known from China and Vietnam. It inhabits the montane and steppe forests of the Himalayas, from 2,000 to 3,938 meters above sea level.

Conservation 
The species is assessed as data-deficient by the IUCN due to lack of information about it. It has a range of over 20,000 sq. km, but could inhabit only 2,000 sq. km of those.

References 

Mammals described in 1847
Bats of Asia
Plecotus